Craig Anthony Considine (born 18 June 1959) is  a former Australian rules footballer who played with Richmond in the Victorian Football League (VFL).		

He also competed in the decathlon representing Australia at the 1978 Commonwealth Games.

Notes

External links 
 		
 
 
 

Living people
1959 births
Australian rules footballers from Victoria (Australia)
Australian decathletes
Richmond Football Club players
Athletes (track and field) at the 1978 Commonwealth Games
Commonwealth Games competitors for Australia